The Mingun Bell is a bell located in Mingun, Sagaing Region, Myanmar. It was the heaviest functioning bell in the world at several times in history.

Description
The weight of the bell is 55,555 viss. This number is conveniently remembered by many people in Myanmar as a mnemonic "Min Hpyu Hman Hman Pyaw", with the consonants representing the number 5 in Burmese astronomy and numerology. The weight of the bell and its mnemonic words are written on the surface of the bell in white.

The bell is uncracked and in good ringing condition. The bell does not have a clapper but is rung by striking the outer edge.

History
Casting of the bell started in 1808 and was finished by 1810. King Bodawpaya (r. 1782–1819) had this gigantic bell cast to go with his huge stupa, Mingun Pahtodawgyi. The bell was said to have been cast on the opposite side of the river and was transported by using two boats, which after crossing the river, proceeded up two specially built canals. The canals were then dammed and the bell was lifted by raising the water level by the addition of earth into the blocked canal. In this way the bell was originally suspended.

The Mingun Bell was knocked off its supports as a result of a large earthquake on 23 March 1839. It was resuspended by the Irrawaddy Flotilla Company in March 1896 using screw jacks and levers using funds from public subscription. Felice Beato captured a photograph of the bell prior to its resuspension.

Current status
At 90 tons, the Mingun Bell reigned as the largest ringing bell in the world until 2000, when it was eclipsed by the 116-ton Bell of Good Luck at the Foquan Temple, Pingdingshan, Henan, China.

Gallery

See also
List of heaviest bells

References

External links

The Mingun Bell in detail

Individual bells in Myanmar
Pitched percussion instruments
Burmese culture
Buddhist art
Buildings and structures completed in 1810